2018 in women's road cycling is about the 2018 women's bicycle races ruled by the UCI and the 2018 UCI Women's Teams.

World Championships

The World Road Championships is set to be held in Innsbruck, Austria.

UCI Women's WorldTour

Single day races (1.1 and 1.2)

† The clock symbol denotes a race which takes the form of a one-day time trial.

Cancelled events

Independence Cycling Classic

Stage races (2.1 and 2.2)

Cancelled events
La Route de France
Trophée d'Or Féminin
Tour of Dongting Lake International Women's Road Cycling Race

Criteriums (CRT)

Championships

International Games

Continental Championships

UCI teams

The country designation of each team is determined by the country of registration of the largest number of its riders, and is not necessarily the country where the team is registered or based.

References

 

Women's road cycling by year